The Locust United Methodist Church is a historic African-American church in Columbia, Maryland. (Once Simpsonville, Atholton and Freetown)

The building was constructed in a predominantly African-American community known as Freetown.

See also
Asbury Methodist Episcopal Church (Annapolis Junction, Maryland)
Mt. Moriah Lodge No. 7

References

External links
Locust Church History

African-American history of Howard County, Maryland
Howard County, Maryland landmarks
Houses in Howard County, Maryland
Methodist churches in Maryland
Churches in Howard County, Maryland